Wakame-vdc is an IaaS (Infrastructure as a Service) cloud computing framework, facilitating the provisioning and management of a heterogeneous virtualized infrastructure. Wakame-vdc virtualizes the entire data center; servers, storage, and networking. Wakame-vdc is managed via a native Web Interface, the Wakame-vdc CLI, or the powerful Wakame-vdc API.

Wakame-vdc is Datacenter Level Hypervisor, and gives the infrastructure higher portability. Since it is fully Open Sourced, with Wakame-vdc it is easy to design and extend the datacenter. Wakame-vdc provides the best method to build the cloud infrastructure.

Goal
Wakame-vdc allows the administrator to spend less time managing the entire data center infrastructure.

Wakame-vdc strives to provide the same experience to the entire data center, as virtual machines have done for operating systems. The VDC (Virtual Data Center) offers virtualized facilities such as servers, storage, and networking, in what can be described as a data center level hypervisor. Deployment, migration and backup of a Wakame-vdc installation can freely be replicated between any site running Wakame-vdc, with minimal reconfiguration.

Users
 KYOCERA Communication Systems Co., Ltd. - GreenOffice Unified Cloud
 NTT PC Communications Incorporated. - WebARENA VPS Cloud (Public Cloud Service)
 Kyushu Electric Power Co., Inc. - Private Cloud
 National Institute of Informatics - Private Cloud

Functions
 Hypervisor (KVM, VMware ESXi, LXC, OpenVZ)
 Flexible Instance Specification Management
 Pluggable Scheduler
 Software LB (Stud + HAProxy)
 Storage (ZFS, Indelible FS)
 SSH Key Pair Management
 Instance Backup
 GUI / Web API (RESTful)
 Transferring Image between DCs
 Management Command Line Interface
 Dynamic Assigned External IP Address
 Virtual Networking (OpenFlow, Multi-tenanted L3 Network, Distributed Firewall)

See also

 OpenVNet
 Amazon EC2
 GreenQloud
 OpenNebula
 OpenStack
 Cloud computing

External links
Wakame-VDC Facebook Page
Wakame-VDC GitHub Repositry
Open Source Evolution: Team Eren Niazi

Cloud infrastructure
Free software programmed in Ruby